Yusuf Muhammad is a British inventor and engineer

Yusuf Muhammad, and other variants, may also refer to:

 Youssef Mohamed (basketball) (1927–2001), Egyptian basketball player
 Youssef Mohamad (footballer, born 1980), Lebanese footballer
 Yousef Mohammed (futsal player) (born 1982), Libyan futsal player
 Yusuf Mohamed (footballer, born 1983), Nigerian footballer
 Yousef Mohammad (footballer, born 1999), Syrian footballer
 Yusuf Mohamed Ismail (1960–2015), Somali diplomat
 Yousif Muhammed Sadiq (born 1978), Iraqi Kurdish politician

See also
 Yusuf
 Muhammad (name)